National Judicial Academy is an Indian government-funded training institute primarily for High Court Judges & Judicial Officers, working on deputation in the Supreme Court and the High Courts. It also provides training to the other Judicial Officers posted in districts on topic which SJA didn't deal under the Continuing Judicial Education (CJE). The institute was registered on 17 August 1993 under the Societies Registration Act of 1860. N. R. Madhava Menon was its founding director.

National skills database

Apart from academics, the institute, with an aim to improve the functioning of the judiciary, is setting up an online skills registry of Indian judges, with their areas of proficiency, which can be accessed by the judges using their credentials.

State Judicial Academies 
Uttarakhand Judicial and Legal Academy
National Law University and Judicial Academy, Assam
West Bengal Judicial Academy

References

Government agencies of India
Legal organisations based in India